The Hollywood Cross (also known as the Hollywood Pilgrimage Memorial Monument) is a 32-foot high, steel cross and historic-cultural monument (#617) in Hollywood, California. Located just above the Ford Amphitheatre and overlooking the Cahuenga Pass, Hollywood Freeway and Hollywood Bowl, it was originally erected as a memorial for Christine Wetherill Stevenson and is now owned by The Church On The Way in Van Nuys, California. In the early 1980s the cross fell into disrepair. Conquest GBC, Inc. led by general contractor Jim Korkunis rebuilt the monument in 1993. A Sikorsky helicopter was rented for a total of $4,500 and took about an hour to place. Today the cross still stands strong and sturdy.

See also
Los Angeles Historic-Cultural Monuments in Hollywood

References

Buildings and structures in Hollywood, Los Angeles
East Hollywood, Los Angeles
Los Angeles Historic-Cultural Monuments